Oobi may refer to:

 Oobi (TV series), an American children's program on the Noggin network
 Oobi (toy), Parker Brothers toy introduced in 1971, to send messages from one location to another
 OOBI, for out-of-band infrastructure, term in the telecommunications industry for voice communication since the 1950s

See also
 Ubi (disambiguation)